Frank Vernon Hemphill (May 13, 1878 – November 16, 1950) was a left fielder in Major League Baseball who played for the Chicago White Sox (1906) and Washington Senators (1909). He was born in Greenville, Michigan. His older brother, Charlie Hemphill, also was a major league player.

In a two-season career, Hemphill was a .070 hitter (3-for-40) with two RBI, nine bases on balls and one stolen base.

In 14 appearances at left field, he collected 33 outs and one assist while committing an error for a .971 fielding percentage.

Hemphill died in Chicago, Illinois at age 72.

References

External links

1878 births
1950 deaths
Major League Baseball left fielders
Chicago White Sox players
Washington Senators (1901–1960) players
Baseball players from Michigan
Bay City (minor league baseball) players
Stratford Poets players
Woodstock Bains players
London Tecumsehs (baseball) players
Fort Wayne Indians players
Los Angeles Angels (minor league) players
Colorado Springs Millionaires players
Milwaukee Brewers (minor league) players
Seattle Siwashes players
Altoona Mountaineers players
Lancaster Red Roses players
Eau Claire Commissioners players
People from Greenville, Michigan